Peepshow Collective is a group of visual artists founded in 2000, most of whom are graduates of Brighton University, England.

History
Peepshow was initially composed of graduates from the 1998 BA (Hons) Illustration course at the University of Brighton. It was founded in 2000 after working as part of the design team that created the 4,000 sq ft (370 m2) 'Hi-Life'  supermarket installation for EXPO 2000 under the direction of UK writer and collage artist Graham Rawle. Since then, as a collective and as individuals, they have worked extensively within the areas of illustration, animation, art direction, motion design, set design, mixed media installation and fashion/textile design.

They fostered relationships with The Victoria and Albert Museum, SHOWstudio and onedotzero as well as many international advertising agencies such as Fallon, Ogilvy and Mather, M&C Saatchi, Wieden + Kennedy and TBWA. Much of the creative input for their commercial work stems from self-initiated activities, events and exhibitions. They were included in the British Council touring expo 'Picture This' and 'Ecology Earth' at the National Museum of Modern Art, Tokyo.

As illustrators they have frequently appeared in publications such as The Guardian, The Observer, The Daily Telegraph and The New York Times and their work regularly features in Creative Review, Design Week and Varoom. They have been asked to contribute to many books on the subject of illustration including 'Pen & Mouse' & 'Hand To Eye' by Angus Hyland and '50 Years of Illustration' & 'The Fundamentals of Illustration' by Lawrence Zeegen. Collectively Peepshow's moving image work has been featured at 'onedotzero: adventures in motion' at the ICA, 'Counter:Vision' at The Hayward Gallery and as part of 'Pictoplasma' in New York as well as appearing on channels such as the BBC, Channel 4 and MTV.

In 2012 they published a book Peepshow Collective, showcasing the output of the collective since its formation  and were artist-in-residence at Somerset House for Pick Me Up with the installation 'The Museum of Objects & Origins'

Since 2014 they have worked extensively on motion design projects from their studio in Shoreditch creating titles, graphics and animation for broadcasters including Amazon Prime, Apple TV+, BBC, CNN, HBO, National Geographic Channel and PBS.

In 2015 they won Outstanding Motion Design at the 67th Emmy Awards for their work on PBS TV Series How We Got To Now.

In 2019 they were awarded the Professional Excellence, Craft Award for Graphics and Titling at The Royal Television Society Scotland Awards. Peepshow's work on National Geographic Channel's ‘Inside North Korea’s Dynasty’ was awarded ‘Outstanding Graphic Design & Art Direction’ at the 40th News & Documentary Emmy Awards.

In 2021 Peepshow created the graphics and visual design for the BBC One and Apple TV+ documentary 9/11: Inside the President's War Room for which they won the 'Design - Programme Content Sequences' category at the 2021 RTS Craft and Design Awards.

In 2022 they created the titles & graphics for the BBC documentary Elizabeth: The Unseen Queen.

Key personnel
The members of Peepshow since its inception include: Luke Best, Jenny Bowers, Graham Carter, Miles Donovan, Chrissie MacDonald, Pete Mellor, Marie O'Connor, Andrew Rae, Elliot Thoburn, Lucy Vigrass and Spencer Wilson.

Exhibitions and installations
 Peepshow, New Inn Yard Gallery, Shoreditch, London, 2001
 Peep(box)show, Various, London, 2002
 Perverted Science, Dreambagsjaguarshoes, Shoreditch, London, 2003
 930sq ft of Peepshow, 17, Shoreditch, London, 2005
 From Start to Finish, Saatchi & Saatchi, London, 2007
 Peepshow's Antarctic Expedition, DDB, London, 2007
 Many Hands Make More Work, Concrete Hermit, Shoreditch, London, 2007
 Ecology Earth 21, Museum of Modern Art, Saitama, Japan, 2008
 In Between, Dreamspace Gallery, London, 2009 
 Pick Me Up, Somerset House, London, 2010
 Museum of Objects & Origins at Pick Me Up, Somerset House, London, 2012 
 PeepShowRoom, Printspace Gallery, Shoreditch, London, 2016

Selected broadcast projects

 SAS Rogue Heroes, BBC, 2022
 Elizabeth: The Unseen Queen, BBC, 2022
 Lucy Worsley Investigates, BBC/PBS, 2022
 Four Hours at the Capitol, BBC/HBO, 2021 
 9/11:Inside The President's War Room, BBC/Apple TV+, 2021 
 Clarkson's Farm, Amazon Prime, 2021 
 Race For The Vaccine, BBC/CNN, 2021 
 Being Bridget Jones, BBC, 2020
 The Rise of The Murdoch Dynasty, BBC, 2020
 Rise of The Nazis, BBC, 2019
 ICONS, BBC, 2019
 Catching Britain's Killers: The Crimes That Changed Us, BBC, 2019
 The Yorkshire Ripper Files: A Very British Crime Story, BBC, 2019
 The Flu That Killed 50 Million, BBC, 2018
 Inside North Korea's Dynasty, National Geographic Channel, 2018
 Angela Carter: Of Wolves and Women, BBC, 2018
 Elizabeth's Secret Agents, BBC, 2016
 Map of Hell, National Geographic Channel, 2016
 How We Got To Now with Steven Johnson, BBC/PBS, 2014

References

External links
Peepshow's Website

British artist groups and collectives
Organizations established in 2000
People associated with the University of Brighton
British illustrators